Davala Satyam is an Indian film director, producer and screenplay writer. He has worked predominantly in Telugu cinema since the early 1980s.

Satyam is known for his revolutionary movies known as Erra Cinema in Telugu. His film Yuvatharam Kadilindi won a Nandi Award for Best Feature Film from the Government of Andhra Pradesh and M. Prabhakar Reddy won the Nandi Award for Best Actor in 1980.

He associated with film personalities such Dasari Narayana Rao, Madala Ranga Rao, Chiranjeevi, Murali Mohan and R. Narayana Murthy.

Satyam directed Chaitanya Ratham (1987), a controversial biopic on politician Vangaveeti Mohana Ranga and his brother Vangaveeti Radha despite the political pressures. Both Ranga and Radha were murdered by political opponents. The movie prints were destroyed.

Filmography
Lava Kusa: The Warrior Twins (2010) (animation film)
Nenu Saitham (2004)
Chaitanya Ratham (1987) (controversial biopic on politician Vangaveeti Mohana Ranga and his brother Vangaveeti Radha)
Mundaithe Oora Habba (Kannada movie starring Jaggesh) (Directed and produced by Dhavala Satyam)
Gudi Gantalu Mrogayi
Erra Mallelu
Jathara (1980)
Yuvatharam Kadilindi (1980)
Bheemudu
Erramatti
Subbaravuki Kopam Vachindi

References

Film directors from Andhra Pradesh
20th-century Indian film directors
Screenwriters from Andhra Pradesh
Telugu film directors
Living people
Year of birth missing (living people)
Telugu screenwriters